The Hewitson's small tree-nymph (Ideopsis hewitsonii) is a species of nymphalid butterfly in the Danainae subfamily. It is endemic to New Guinea (Indonesia).

References

Sources

Ideopsis
Butterflies of Indonesia
Endemic fauna of Indonesia
Butterflies described in 1877
Taxonomy articles created by Polbot
Endemic fauna of New Guinea